The Information Secretary of Pakistan is the Federal Secretary for the Ministry of Information, Broadcasting and National Heritage. The position holder is a BPS-22 grade officer, usually belonging to the Pakistan Administrative Service. The Information Secretary heads the Ministry that is responsible to release government information, media galleries, public domain and government unclassified non-scientific data to the public and international communities. Information Secretary is a prominent position in the federal government.

See also
Government of Pakistan
Federal Secretary
Interior Secretary of Pakistan
Cabinet Secretary of Pakistan
Finance Secretary of Pakistan
Petroleum Secretary of Pakistan
Ministry of Information, Broadcasting and National Heritage

References

Ministry of Information and Broadcasting (Pakistan)